Koren Shadmi (born 1981) is an Israeli-American illustrator and cartoonist.

Career
In 1998, at age 17, Shadmi released his first graphic novel in Israel, Profile 107, a collaboration with mentor cartoonist Uri Fink. In 2002 Shadmi relocated to New York to study at the School of Visual Arts, where he now teaches illustration.

Shadmi's books have been published in France, Italy, Spain, Israel, and the U.S. His first English book, In The Flesh, - a collection of comics dealing with relationships - was published by Random House in 2009. His short story "Antoinette" was selected for the Best American Comics 2009 anthology edited by Charles Burns.

He is the creator of the mystery webcomic The Abaddon, loosely based on Jean-Paul Sartre’s existential play No Exit. The Abaddon was published in book form by Z2 Comics in 2015 to critical acclaim.

In 2015 Shadmi illustrated the book Mike's Place: A True Story of Love, Blues, and Terror in Tel Aviv published by First Second Comics.

In 2016, Shadmi’s semi-autobiographical comic Love Addict: Confessions of a Serial Dater was published by Top Shelf. The book deals with the perils of online dating.

Expected in Spring 2017, a collaboration between David Kushner and Koren Shadmi, Rise of the Dungeon Master. The graphic novel is based on a WIRED article written by the award-winning Kushner, profiling Gary Gygax, the founder of the tabletop role-playing game Dungeons & Dragons.

Shadmi's illustration clients include: The New York Times, The Wall Street Journal, Mother Jones, Playboy, BusinessWeek, The Village Voice, The Washington Post, The Boston Globe, Wired, Spin, ESPN the Magazine, Popular Mechanics, Random House, W.W Norton, The Weinstein Company, The New Yorker, and many others.

Personal life
Shadmi currently lives and works in Brooklyn, New York.

Awards 
Albert Dorne Award, Society of Illustrators (2006)
Gran Guinigi Award, Lucca Comics and Games Festival, Italy (2008)
"Antoinette" (short story) was selected for the anthology Best American Comics 2009, edited by Charles Burns (2009)
Gold Medal in the ″Uncommissioned″ category, Society of Illustrators (2011) 
Rudolph Dirks Award in the ″Mature/Erotic″ category, German Comic Con (2016)
Ignatz Award: nominated in two categories (Outstanding Artist and Outstanding Graphic Novel) for Highwayman, 2019

References

External links
 
 Interview at Comics Foundry Magazine
 Q&A with Koren Shadmi at Robot 6
 Excerpt from 'A Date' - New York Magazine

Living people
Israeli illustrators
Graphic novelists
School of Visual Arts alumni
1981 births